The 2021–22 Liga Nacional de Hockey Hielo season was the 48th season of the Liga Nacional de Hockey Hielo, the top level of ice hockey in Spain. Eight teams participated in the league.

Teams

Regular season

Statistics

Scoring leaders 
The following players led the league in points, at the conclusion of matches played on 20 February 2022.

Results

Playoffs

Semi-finals

Finals

Final rankings

References

External links 
Official site
Liga Nacional de Hockey Hielo on eurohockey.com
Liga Nacional de Hockey Hielo on eliteprospects.com

Spain
Liga Nacional de Hockey Hielo seasons
Liga